Andrea Šuldesová (born 11 February 1975 in Valtice) is a retired Czech athlete who specialised in the 1500 metres. She finished sixth at the 1997 World Championships in Athens.

Competition record

Personal bests
Outdoor
800 metres – 2:01.22 (Malmö 1997)
1000 metres – 2:43.81 (Nove Mesto nad Metuji 2003)
1500 metres – 4:06.13 (Hengelo 1998)
One mile – 4:33.65 (Sheffield 1998)
2000 metres – 5:44.98 (Ostrava 2003) NR
3000 metres – 8:52.05 (Rieti 1998)
Indoor
800 metres – 2:03.39 (Prague 2004)
1500 metres – 4:06.37 (Maebashi 1999)
2000 metres – 5:55.98 (Chemnitz 2001)
3000 metres – 8:49.15 (Erfurt 1999)

References

1975 births
Living people
Czech female middle-distance runners
People from Valtice
Czechoslovak female middle-distance runners
World Athletics Championships athletes for the Czech Republic
Sportspeople from the South Moravian Region